Thomas Kendrick may refer to:

T. D. Kendrick (Thomas Downing Kendrick, 1895–1979), British archaeologist and art historian
Thomas Kendrick (agent) (1881–1972), British intelligence agent
Thomas Kendrick (Medal of Honor) (born 1839), American sailor in the Union Navy during the Civil War
Thomas Kendrick (painter) (born c. 1839), British painter